Tungsten(V) chloride is an inorganic compound with the formula W2Cl10. This compound is analogous in many ways to the more familiar molybdenum pentachloride.

The material is prepared by reduction of tungsten hexachloride.  One method involves the use of tetrachloroethylene as the reductant
2 WCl6  +  C2Cl4   →   W2Cl10  +  C2Cl6
The blue green solid is volatile under vacuum and slightly soluble in nonpolar solvents.  The compound is oxophilic and is highly reactive toward Lewis bases.

Structure
The compound exists as a dimer, with a pair of octahedral tungsten(V) centres bridged by two chloride ligands.  The W---W separation is 3.814 Å, which is non-bonding.  The compound is isostructural with Nb2Cl10 and Mo2Cl10.  The compound evaporates to give trigonal bipyramidal WCl5 monomers.

References

Chlorides
Tungsten halides